Come Taste the Band is the tenth studio album by English rock band Deep Purple, released on 7 November 1975. It was co-produced and engineered by the band and longtime associate Martin Birch.

It was the final Deep Purple studio record prior to the band's initial disbandment in 1976, therefore making it the only album to feature Tommy Bolin (who replaced Ritchie Blackmore on guitar), and the final of three albums to feature David Coverdale on lead vocals and Glenn Hughes on bass guitar/vocals: Bolin died shortly after the album's release, while neither Coverdale nor Hughes would be involved with the reactivated Deep Purple in 1984.

Release and reception

The album sold reasonably well upon release (#19 in the UK charts, and #43 in the US). The album was certified Silver on 7 November 1975 by the BPI, selling 60,000 copies in the UK.

In recent years the album has received some critical reassessment "on its own merits", in part due to Bolin's contributions to the album. Gillan (who left the band just over two years prior), on the other hand, has stated that he does not view the album as a real Deep Purple album. Lord praised the quality of the album years later in interviews, stating that "listening to it now, it's a surprisingly good album," while acknowledging, "the worst thing you can say about it is that, in most people's opinion, it's not a Deep Purple album."

Record World said that the single "Gettin' Tighter" "shows the group at its best: rockin' up a storm."

Released on 25 October 2010, the 2-CD Deluxe 35th Anniversary edition includes the original album in remastered form plus a rare US single edit of "You Keep On Moving" on the first disc, and a full album remix and two unissued tracks on the second disc: "Same in LA" a three-minute out-take from the final release in 1975, and "Bolin/Paice Jam" a five-minute instrumental jam with Bolin and Ian Paice.

After tours for this album concluded in March 1976, Deep Purple broke up for eight years. Tommy Bolin formed his own band that toured in support of Peter Frampton and Jeff Beck, but it was short-lived as he died of multiple drug intoxication in December, 1976. Morphine, cocaine, lidocaine and alcohol were all found in his system.

Track listings
All lead vocals by David Coverdale unless noted.

35th Anniversary Edition

Personnel
Deep Purple
 David Coverdale – lead vocals
 Tommy Bolin – lead & acoustic guitars, backing vocals; bass guitar (track 1), co-lead vocals (track 4)
 Jon Lord – keyboards, piano, synthesizer, backing vocals
 Glenn Hughes – bass guitar, co-vocals (all but track 1), lead vocals (tracks 3 & 8) 
 Ian Paice – drums

Production
 Produced by Martin "The Wasp" Birch and Deep Purple
 Engineered by Martin Birch
 Final mix by Martin Birch and Ian Paice
 Cover photography by Peter Williams
 Remastered by Dave Schultz and Bill Inglot at Digiprep, Los Angeles
 2010 remix by Kevin Shirley at The Cave, Malibu, California
 Mastered by Bob Ludwig

Charts

Certifications

References

Deep Purple albums
1975 albums
Albums produced by Martin Birch
Hard rock albums
Funk rock albums
Heavy metal albums
Warner Records albums
Purple Records albums